Arvin Union School District is a public school district based in Kern County, California.

There are four schools in the district.

References

External links
 

School districts in Kern County, California